Sara Mameni (born March 29, 1977) is assistant professor at University of California, Berkeley.

Writing & career 
Mameni completed a B.F.A. in Visual Arts from Emily Carr University of Art and Design, an M.A. from the University of British Columbia and a Ph.D. in Art History from the University of California.  Mameni has written articles and reviews for Canadian Art, Fuse Magazine, Filip Review, Signs, and the Journal of Women and Performance. In June 2011 Mameni curated the exhibition, Snail Fever, at the Third Line Gallery in Dubai. Mameni was an education coordinator at the Vancouver Art Gallery, a post-doctoral fellow at the University of California, Santa Cruz, and the Director of the Aesthetics and Politics MA program at the California Institute for the Arts.

Selected publications 

 "Dermopolitics: Erotics of the Muslim Body in Pain", Women and Performance: A Journal of Feminist Theory, 2017.
 "Car Flirting and Morality Cruising: Neurotic Gazes and Paranoid Glances in Contemporary Iranian Art", AL- Raida, 2013. 
 "Adventures in History: Isabelle Pauwels at the Henry Art Gallery",Canadian Art, 2010.
 "Invasion of the Cybernetic Hand and Other Predicaments: Kristen Lucas at Or Gallery", Fillip Review, 2007.

Artistic practice 
Mameni has an interdisciplinary art practice that includes sound installation, drawing, and creative and scholarly writing. Mameni's artworks are in permanent collections at the Morris and Helen Belkin Art Gallery and the Vancouver Art Gallery.

Selected exhibitions 
 Again and Again and Again: Serial Formats and Repetitive Actions, Vancouver Art Gallery, 2012.
 Everything Should be As Simple As Possible But Not Simpler, Western Front, 2008.
 Between Us: Toronto/Vancouver Exchange, YYZ Artists' Outlet, 2008.
 White Noise: Sara Mameni and Isabelle Pauwels, State Gallery, 2005.
 The Poster Project, Artspeak, 2004.

Awards 
In 2009, Mameni was awarded the Canadian Art Foundation Writing Prize for her account of artist Denise Oleksijczuks’ creation of the film Role. Mameni has received grants from Canada Council for the Arts and the Mary Lily Research Grant.

References

1977 births
Living people
21st-century Canadian artists
Canadian women artists
Emily Carr University of Art and Design alumni
University of British Columbia alumni
University of California, San Diego alumni